Beulah Methodist Episcopal Church is a historic church at 242 North Main in Falls City, Oregon.

It was built in 1892 and added to the National Register in 2002.

References

Methodist churches in Oregon
Churches on the National Register of Historic Places in Oregon
Carpenter Gothic church buildings in Oregon
Churches completed in 1892
Buildings and structures in Polk County, Oregon
1892 establishments in Oregon
National Register of Historic Places in Polk County, Oregon